Cyclone is the alias of a number of fictional characters appearing in American comic books published by Marvel Comics.

A creature based on "Cyclone" appeared in the 2019 Marvel Cinematic Universe film Spider-Man: Far From Home, which was actually an illusion created by a series of drones operated by Mysterio.

Publication history
The original Cyclone first appeared in The Amazing Spider-Man #143 and was created by Gerry Conway and Ross Andru.

The second Cyclone first appeared in Marvel Comics Presents #47 and was created by Sholly Fisch, Mark Bagley, and Don Hudson.

The third Cyclone first appeared in Thunderbolts #3 and was created by Kurt Busiek, Mark Bagley, and Vince Russell.

Fictional character biography

André Gerard

André Gerard was born in Lyon, France. Formerly a French engineer working for NATO, Gerard had a falling out with his former employees, supposedly related to political decisions over implementing his research, based on the development of a weapon that generates high velocity tornado-like winds. Cyclone took his invention and used it for his own criminal ends, developing his costume and other weapons. Like many criminal masterminds in Spider-Man comics, he decided to form a gang and capture J. Jonah Jameson, the owner of the Daily Bugle, and like so many criminal masterminds who follow this plan, he was defeated by Spider-Man. He also kidnapped Joseph "Robbie" Robertson, but was again defeated by Spider-Man.

He was subsequently broken out of prison by the Masked Marauder and employed by the Nefaria Family of the Maggia as an enforcer. Cyclone was sent to kill Spider-Man and Moon Knight, but was defeated by Moon Knight. He was doing relatively well for himself, in spite of his defeats at the hands of Spider-Man. Concerned over the deaths of various costumed villains by the vigilante Scourge organization, Cyclone attended a meeting at the "Bar with No Name" in Medinah County, Ohio, to deal with the Scourge and was shot to death by a Scourge agent posing as the bartender.

Gerard's DNA was later used by Arnim Zola to create a proto-husk. This proto-husk attacked and was killed by Deadpool.

André Gerard seemingly returned from the dead in the 2007-08 Captain Marvel mini-series, but it is revealed that this is really a Skrull impostor. It was killed by Captain Marvel (who was actually a Skrull sleeper agent) with its remains decimated in one powerful attack.

Cyclone was later among the eighteen victims of Scourge to be resurrected by Hood using the power of Dormammu as part of a squad assembled to eliminate the Punisher. After the Punisher is captured, he is present at the ritual where the Hood intends to resurrect the Punisher's family. The Hood gives the Punisher a knife to sacrifice G. W. Bridge, but the Punisher instead uses the knife to slash Cyclone's throat.

Gregory Stevens

The second Cyclone appeared in Marvel Comics Presents #97/4 (December 1992). Gregory Stevens acquired the Cyclone costume. At the "Bar with No Name," Cyclone participated in a bar fight initiated by the Impossible Man posing as the Ace of Spades in a poker game.

He later assisted various agents of Justin Hammer (consisting of Afterburner, Beetle, Blacklash, a substitute Blizzard, Boomerang and Spymaster) in attacking Silver Sable and her Wild Pack. Cyclone used his cyclone-producing gloves to throw rubble at Silver Sable's group. Cyclone and Beetle retreated when Larry Arnold started shooting at them.

Never saying a word in all of his appearances, Stevens was reported killed in a skiing accident.

Pierre Fresson

Pierre Fresson was a member of a European crime family who was given the recreated Cyclone suit. Not wishing to serve the European crime family any longer, he stole the suit and fled. Now freelance, he operated as an agent of Justin Hammer, before being recruited into Justine Hammer's first incarnation of the Masters of Evil. As a part of the Masters of Evil, Cyclone battled against the Thunderbolts and other assorted heroes. Fresson also represented the European families when Grim Reaper called a meeting of Maggia bosses.

Later, he attempted to steal Justin Hammer's will, before being soundly defeated by the Thunderbolts again. After it was revealed that Justin Hammer had planted time bombs in his former agents, Cyclone was given the option to work with the Thunderbolts to rid themselves of the threat. At first, Fresson attempted to flee, but quickly surrendered and joined the Thunderbolts. Running into Silver Sable like his predecessor, Fresson would assist the Thunderbolts in freeing Justin Hammer's former agents of their biological time bomb. He was also with the Thunderbolts when they attacked the omnipotent Thanos after Thanos had received the power of the Heart of the Infinite. Cyclone would battle against the Elite Agents of S.H.I.E.L.D. before Hawkeye would give him the option of either remaining a Thunderbolt or being cut loose. Choosing the latter, Cyclone was dropped with an electrical arrow and turned over to S.H.I.E.L.D. as he was no longer a Thunderbolt and therefore a felon.

During the "Civil War" storyline, someone that looks like Cyclone popped up in Hammerhead's villain army when S.H.I.E.L.D. attacked their headquarters.

Boomerang and Owl hire Cyclone onto the Sinister Sixteen, assembled to distract the Chameleon's forces while Boomerang steals from him. When the police arrived, Cyclone and most of the Sinister Sixteen surrendered.

After being bailed out of jail, Cyclone, Man Mountain Marko, Shriek, and Kangaroo instigated a bar fight against Boomerang's group. After nearly taking out Beetle, Cyclone was tackled by Speed Demon who took Cyclone as far away as the New Jersey Turnpike South.

As part of the "All-New, All-Different Marvel," Cyclone was causing havoc in Atlantic City with his artificial hurricane. He faced off against the Avengers and is defeated by Vision.

During the "Opening Salvo" part of the Secret Empire storyline, Cyclone is recruited by Baron Helmut Zemo to join the Army of Evil.

Powers and abilities
The original Cyclone was a man with gifted intelligence, with a master's degree in mechanical engineering.

He was able to use these whirlwinds to fly and could use them offensively against opponents. His costume was later passed on to the second Cyclone and later recreated for the third Cyclone.

In other media
A member of the Elementals modeled after Cyclone appears in the live-action Marvel Cinematic Universe film Spider-Man: Far From Home. Identified as the Air Elemental, it was said to have power over wind and storms. Prior to the film's events, Mysterio claims to have defeated it, but Peter Parker discovers all of the Elementals were actually drones equipped with holographic technology that Mysterio and his fellow ex-Stark Industries employees used to acquire Tony Stark's technology and pass off Mysterio as a superhero.

References

External links
 Cyclone I at Marvel.com
 Cyclone III at Marvel.com
 Cyclone Proto-Husk at Marvel.com
 Profile at Spiderfan.org
 
 
 

Articles about multiple fictional characters
Characters created by Gerry Conway
Characters created by Kurt Busiek
Characters created by Ross Andru
Comics characters introduced in 1975
Fictional characters with air or wind abilities
Fictional engineers
Fictional French people
Marvel Comics male supervillains
Marvel Comics supervillains
Spider-Man characters